The  is a burial chamber that protects 54 urns containing the hearts of members of the House of Habsburg. The crypt is located behind the Loreto Chapel in the Augustinian Church within the Hofburg Palace complex in Vienna, Austria.

The first heart, belonging to King Ferdinand IV, was placed in the Augustinian Church on 10 July 1654, according to his wishes. The last heart, belonging to Archduke Franz Karl of Austria, was placed in the crypt on 8 March 1878. The bodies of all but three of the hearts are in the Imperial Crypt a few blocks away.

History
King Ferdinand IV instructed that his heart would be interred at the foot of the Holy Mother in the Augustinian Church in Vienna. Following the death of the king on 9 July 1654, the corpse was embalmed and the heart was placed in a goblet and displayed on the death bed. The next day, around 9:00 pm, the heart was transferred to the Loreto Chapel and buried at the foot of the Madonna in a simple celebration. With this simple act of piety, a custom was started to bury the hearts of all members of the House of Habsburg in the crypt alongside the heart of King Ferdinand IV. By 1878, 54 hearts had been brought to this simple crypt.

Crypt

Upper row
In the upper row, arranged in sequence of death date (from left to right):

 Daughter of Ferdinand II, Duke of Tyrol and wife of her cousin Emperor Matthias. Buried in tomb 1 in the Imperial Crypt.
 Third son of Emperor Maximilian II. Husband of Empress Anna. Buried in tomb 2 in the Imperial Crypt.
 Eldest son of Archduke Charles II of Styria. Buried in the Grazer Dom, Graz.
 Eldest son of Emperor Ferdinand III. Founder of this Herzgruft. Buried in tomb 29 in the Imperial Crypt.
 Son of Emperor Ferdinand II. Named at age 13 to take over his uncle Leopold's renounced see of Halberstaedt (when he became 22, this was confirmed by the Pope) and later became also Bishop of Olomouc, Bishop of Breslau, and Grand Master of the Teutonic Knights. Buried in tomb 115 in the Imperial Crypt.
 Niece, cousine and first wife of Emperor Leopold I at age 15. Buried in tomb 20 in the Imperial Crypt.
 Third wife of Emperor Ferdinand III. Foundress of the Order of the Starry Cross (the Sternkreuzorden). Buried in tomb 19 in the Imperial Crypt.
 Daughter of Emperor Leopold I and wife of Maximilian II Emanuel, Elector of Bavaria. Buried in tomb 28 in the Imperial Crypt.
 Twelve-year-old daughter of Emperor Leopold I. Buried in tomb 25 of the Imperial Crypt.
 Daughter of Emperor Leopold I. Buried in tomb 16 in the Imperial Crypt.
 Second son of Emperor Ferdinand III and father of Emperors Joseph I and Karl IV. Buried in tomb 37 in the Imperial Crypt.
 Son of Emperor Leopold I. Buried in tomb 35 in the Imperial Crypt.
 Younger son of Emperor Leopold I. Buried in tomb 40 in the Imperial Crypt.
 Daughter of Emperor Leopold I. Buried in tomb 38 in the Imperial Crypt.
 Daughter of Emperor Karl VI. and sister of Empress Maria Theresia. Buried in tomb 39 in the Imperial Crypt.
 Daughter of Prince Charles of Lorraine and Archduchess Maria Anna.  Buried in tomb 47 in the Imperial Crypt.
 Wife (1708) of Emperor Karl VI and mother of Empress Maria Theresa. Buried in tomb 36 in the Imperial Crypt.
 Second son of Emperor Franz I Stephen and Empress Maria Theresa.  Buried in tomb 44 in the Imperial Crypt.
 Eighth daughter of Emperor Franz I Stephen and Empress Maria Theresa. Buried in tomb 45 in the Imperial Crypt.
 Duke of Lorraine and Grand Duke of Tuscany. Husband of Empress Maria Theresa, Buried in tomb 55 in the Imperial Crypt.
 Eldest surviving descendant of Emperor Karl VI,→Family Tree her ascension was contested and officially the crown of the Empire went to her husband (1736) Emperor Franz I Stephen. Buried in tomb 56 in the Imperial Crypt.
 Infant first daughter of Emperor Franz II and Empress Maria Theresia Caroline. Buried in tomb 66 in the Imperial Crypt.
 Third son of Empress Maria Theresia. →Family Tree Buried in tomb 113 in the Imperial Crypt.
 Wife of Emperor Leopold II and mother of Emperor Franz II. Buried in tomb 114 in the Imperial Crypt.
 Daughter of Emperor Franz II and Maria Theresia Caroline. Buried in tomb 95 in the Imperial Crypt.
 Fourth son of Emperor Leopold II and Empress Maria Ludovika. Buried in tomb 64 in the Imperial Crypt.
 Daughter of Emperor Leopold II and Empress Maria Ludovika. Buried in tomb 65 in the Imperial Crypt.
 Favorite daughter of Empress Maria Theresia. and wife of Duke Albert of Teschen. The famous and moving monument he erected to her memory is in the nave of this Augustinerkirche church. Buried in tomb 112 in the Imperial Crypt.
 Fourth daughter of Emperor Franz II and Maria Theresia. Buried in tomb 87 in the Imperial Crypt.
 Youngest son of Empress Maria Theresia. Archbishop of Cologne. Buried in tomb 118 in the Imperial Crypt.
 Daughter of Emperor Franz II and Maria Theresia. Buried in tomb 79 in the Imperial Crypt.
 Daughter of Queen Maria Karolina of Naples and Sicily. First wife (1790) of Ferdinand III, Grand Duke of Tuscany.  →Family Tree Buried in tomb 84 in the Imperial Crypt.

Lower row
In the lower row, arranged in sequence of death date (from left to right):

 Daughter of Empress Maria Theresia. Buried in St. Vitus Cathedral in Prague.

 Fourth son of Empress Maria Theresia. Buried in tomb 105 in the Imperial Crypt.
 Second wife (1790) at age 18 of Emperor Franz II. Buried in tomb 60 in the Imperial Crypt.
 Second son of Emperor Franz II and Empress Maria Theresia Carolina. Buried in tomb 69 in the Imperial Crypt.
 Fourth son of Emperor Franz II and Empress Maria Theresia Carolina. Buried in tomb 71 in the Imperial Crypt.
 Daughter of Empress Maria Theresia. Buried in tomb 107 in the Imperial Crypt.
 Third wife (1808) at age 20 of 40-year-old cousin Emperor Franz II. Buried in tomb 58 in the Imperial Crypt.
 Husband of Archduchess Maria Christina. Buried in tomb 111 in the Imperial Crypt.
 Infant son of Archduke Karl. Buried in tomb 125 in the Imperial Crypt.
 Son of Napoléon Bonaparte and Empress Maria Louise (daughter of Emperor Franz II.) Buried in Les Invalides in Paris.
 Eldest son of Emperor Leopold II. →Family Tree Buried in tomb 57 in the Imperial Crypt.
 Eighth son of Emperor Leopold II. Last Grand Master of the Order of Teutonic Knights before Napoleon suppressed it outside of the Habsburg lands. Buried in tomb 103 in the Imperial Crypt.
 Duke of Teschen, third son of Emperor Leopold II. Adopted son of his aunt Archduchess Maria Christina. and Albert of Saxony-Teschen. Buried in tomb 122 of the Imperial Crypt.
 Son of Archduke Ferdinand Karl Anton. Buried in tomb 102 in the Imperial Crypt.
 Infant first son of Archduke Karl Ferdinand. Buried in tomb 68 in the Imperial Crypt.
 Unmarried 54-year-old daughter of Emperor Franz II and Maria Theresia Carolina. Buried in tomb 82 in the Imperial Crypt.
 Wife of Archduke Albrecht. Buried in tomb 129 in the Imperial Crypt.
 Eleventh son of Emperor Leopold II. Buried in tomb 104 in the Imperial Crypt.
 Second wife (1821) of Ferdinand III, Grand Duke of Tuscany. Buried in tomb 86 in the Imperial Crypt.
 Daughter of Archduke Albrecht. Buried in tomb 130 in the Imperial Crypt.
 Son of Emperor Franz II. Buried in tomb 62 in the Imperial Crypt.
 Third son of Emperor Franz II. and father of Emperor Franz Josef. Buried in tomb 135 in the Imperial Crypt.

See also
Ducal Crypt
Heart-burial
Imperial Crypt

References

External links
Official Website (in German)
The World of the Habsburgs

Cemeteries in Vienna
House of Habsburg
Tourist attractions in Vienna
Hofburg
Sarcophagi